is an original Japanese anime television series animated by Shin-Ei Animation with cooperation by M2 Animation and  and directed by Pino Aruto. It is written by Kimiko Ueno, with Yashikin composing the music. It aired from July to September 2022 on TV Tokyo and BS Asahi.

Characters

Media

Manga
A four-panel manga adaptation, written and illustrated by Tsutsumi Mai, began serialization online via  Twitter and Instagram on June 26, 2022. It has been collected in a single tankōbon volume by Shueisha as of September 2022.

Anime
The original anime television series was announced on January 31, 2022. Pino Aruto is directing the anime at Shin-Ei Animation, with M2 Animation and DeeDee Animation Studio cooperating the animation, Takashi Aoshima writing the scripts, and Yasuhiro Misawa composing the music. Original character designs are provided by Kanahei, while Mai Tsutsumi adapts the designs for animation. The series aired from July 7 to September 30, 2022 on TV Tokyo and BS Asahi. The opening theme song is "Marukoppa" by Chiaki Mayumura, while the ending theme song is "Nanda Nannan da!" by Mikako Komatsu. Sentai Filmworks has licensed the series.

References

External links
 Anime official website 
 

Anime with original screenplays
Comedy anime and manga
Demons in anime and manga
Demons in television
Japanese webcomics
Sentai Filmworks
Shin-Ei Animation
Shochiku
Shueisha manga
TV Tokyo original programming
Yonkoma